Gmina Łubnice may refer to either of the following rural administrative districts in Poland:
Gmina Łubnice, Świętokrzyskie Voivodeship
Gmina Łubnice, Łódź Voivodeship